The 1971–72 Irish Cup was the 92nd edition of the premier knock-out cup competition in Northern Irish football. 

Coleraine won the cup for the 2nd time, defeating Portadown 2–1 in the final at Windsor Park.

The holders Distillery were eliminated in the first round by Coleraine.

Results

First round

|}

Quarter-finals

|}

Replay

|}

Semi-finals

|}

Replay

|}

Final

References

External links
The Rec.Sport.Soccer Statistics Foundation - Northern Ireland - Cup Finals

Irish Cup seasons
1971–72 in Northern Ireland association football
1971–72 domestic association football cups